Sule Skerry is a remote skerry in the North Atlantic off the north coast of Scotland.

Geography
Sule Skerry and Sule Stack are both a part of the Orkney Islands council area.

It is formed of Lewisian gneiss.

Biology
Sule Skerry together with Sule Stack are listed as a Special Protection Area as they are home during the breeding season to thousands of puffins and gannets and smaller numbers of the rarer Leach's storm petrel and storm petrels. Note that Leach's petrel visit the island but breeding is not proved. Since the first visiting birds in 2003 there is now a large breeding population of gannets; a possible overflow from nearby Sule Stack.

Every three years the puffins and other seabirds on Sule Skerry are monitored by a team of birders called the Sule Skerry Ringing Group. They have been monitoring the seabirds on the island since 1975.

The island is treeless, since few trees would withstand the high winds of winter and salt spray environment. The dominant plant is maritime mayweed (Tripleurospermum maritimum).

Lighthouse

There is a lighthouse at the centre high point of the island and a number of small cairns around the periphery.
According to the Guinness Book of Records, the Sule Skerry lighthouse was the most remote manned lighthouse in Great Britain from its opening in 1895 to its automation in 1982. Its remote location meant that construction could only take place during the summer, thus it took from 1892–94 to complete.

A meteorological buoy used in Met Office's Marine Automatic Weather Station (MAWS) Network is located off Sule Skerry. Results from the buoy are used in the Shipping Forecast.

Folklore 
"The Great Silkie of Sule Skerry" is a story of a Silkie who lives on Sule Skerry.

See also

 List of islands in Scotland
 List of lighthouses in Scotland
 List of Northern Lighthouse Board lighthouses
 List of outlying islands of Scotland

References

External links 

 Northern Lighthouse Board 
 Sule Skerry Lighthouse

Sites of Special Scientific Interest in Orkney
Special Protection Areas in Scotland
Skerries of Scotland
Uninhabited islands of Orkney